The 2008-09 season was the 18th edition of Europe's premier basketball tournament for women since it was rebranded to its current format. It was won once again for the third time in a row by Spartak Moscow after defeating 2003 champions UMMC Ekaterimburg and first time finalists Perfumerías Avenida Salamanca in the final four, which took place in the latter's court.

Group stage

Group D

Knockout stage

Round of 16

Round of 8

 if necessary

External links
  FIBA Europe website
  EuroLeague Women official website

Fenerbahçe Basketball